A total lunar eclipse will take place between Sunday, September 7 and Monday, September 8, 2025. The Moon will barely miss the center of the Earth's shadow. It will be the second of two total lunar eclipses. Occurring roughly 3 days before perigee, the Moon will appear larger than usual.

This eclipse is the second of an almost tetrad, with others being 14 Mar 2025 (T), 03 Mar 2026 (T) and 28 Aug 2026 (P).

Visibility
It will be completely visible over much of Asia, Australia and eastern Africa, will be seen rising over the rest of Africa and Europe, and setting over eastern Asia and New Zealand.

Related eclipses

Eclipses of 2025 
 A total lunar eclipse on March 14.
 A partial solar eclipse on March 29.
 A total lunar eclipse on September 7.
 A partial solar eclipse on September 21.

Lunar year series

Saros series 

Lunar Saros 128 contains 15 total lunar eclipses between 1845 and 2097 (in years 1845, 1863, 1881, 1899, 1917, 1935, 1953, 1971, 1989, 2007, 2025, 2043, 2061, 2079 and 2097). Solar Saros 135 interleaves with this lunar saros with an event occurring every 9 years 5 days alternating between each saros series.

Metonic cycle (19 years)
This eclipse is the second of four Metonic cycle lunar eclipses on the same date, September 7, each separated by 19 years:

Half-Saros cycle
A lunar eclipse will be preceded and followed by solar eclipses by 9 years and 5.5 days (a half saros). This lunar eclipse is related to two annular solar eclipses of Solar Saros 135.

See also
List of lunar eclipses and List of 21st-century lunar eclipses

Notes

External links
Saros cycle 128

2025-09
2025-09
2025 in science